The Doll People is a children's novel written by Ann M. Martin and Laura Godwin, first published in 2000. It is illustrated by Brian Selznick, the author of The Invention of Hugo Cabret. It tells a story about the imaginary world of dolls when no one is watching. A doll made from china and her new best friend made of plastic try to find her aunt that long ago went on an adventure and never came back. Others in the series include The Meanest Doll in the World, The Runaway Dolls, The Doll People Set Sail, and The Doll People's Christmas (picture book)

Plot introduction
This children's tale is about a doll made of china named Annabelle, who has existed for more than one hundred years.  The book is set in the present time period and is told in the third person. Annabelle and her family belong to an 8-year-old girl named Kate Palmer, having previously been owned by Kate's great-grandmother Gertrude when she was born in 1898, later her grandmother Katherine, then her mother Annie.  The dolls can move, talk, and play the miniature piano in their house but always return to the same spot they started from when a human approaches.  The consequence of being seen moving is being "frozen" for twenty-four hours, also called Doll State.  If a doll does something especially incriminating, the doll is "frozen" forever, called Permanent Doll State. Kate's sister Nora receives a doll house and plastic doll family named the Funcrafts for her 5th birthday. The Funcrafts' daughter is Tiffany and she becomes Annabelle's best friend. In the book, Annabelle and her friend Tiffany form a group called the Society for Exploration and Location of Missing Persons (or SELMP for short), when Annabelle finds her Auntie Sarah's Journal. Auntie Sarah has been missing for 45 years and has not been seen or heard from in all that time. Annabelle and Tiffany become determined to find her. Using the clues from the journal, they deduce she is stuck somewhere, so they go on a journey and successfully locate her. The doll family has happily reunited once again.

References

American children's novels
2000 American novels
Sentient toys in fiction
2000 children's books